Jellicoe may refer to:

People
 John Jellicoe Blair, RAF pilot during WWII
 Ann Jellicoe (1927–2017), British actress, theatre director and playwright
 Sir Geoffrey Jellicoe (1900–1996), British landscape architect
 George Jellicoe, 2nd Earl Jellicoe (1918–2007), British army officer, politician and businessman
 John Jellicoe, 1st Earl Jellicoe (1859–1935), British Royal Navy officer

Other uses
 Jellicoe (band), a British band
 Jellicoe, Ontario, a village located near Lake Nipigon in Greenstone, Ontario
 Jellicoe Channel connecting the Hauraki Gulf with the Pacific Ocean
 Earl Jellicoe, a title in the Peerage of the United Kingdom

See also
 Jellico (disambiguation)